The 1990 Australian Manufacturers' Championship was open to manufacturers of cars complying with CAMS Group 3A Touring car regulations and was contested over a four-round series.

Schedule 
 
Round 1, Sandown 500, Sandown Raceway, Victoria, 9 September
Round 2, Tooheys 1000, Mount Panorama Circuit, Bathurst, New South Wales, 30 September
Round 3, Ansett Air Freight Challenge, Adelaide Parklands, South Australia, 3 & 4 November
Round 4, Nissan Sydney 500, Eastern Creek Raceway, New South Wales, 10 November
Rounds were run concurrently with those of the 1990 Australian Endurance Championship.

"Australian Motor Racing Year, 1990/91" suggests that the championship win was tied between Ford & Holden however both the CAMS Manual of Motor Sport (post 1990 editions) and www.camsmanual.com.au state that the title was awarded solely to the Ford Motor Company of Australia.

References 
Australian Motor Racing Year, 1990/91
CAMS Manual of Motor Sport, 1990
Racing Car News,  December 1990

Australian Manufacturers' Championship
Manufacturers' Championship